Seminole High School may refer to:
Seminole High School (Pinellas County, Florida) located in Seminole, Florida
Seminole High School (Seminole County, Florida) located in Sanford, Florida
Seminole High School (Oklahoma) located in Seminole, Oklahoma
Seminole High School (Texas) located in Seminole, Texas